LFHS may refer to:

 Bourg - Ceyzériat Airport in France (ICAO code)
 Lake Forest High School (Illinois), Lake Forest, Lake County, Illinois, USA
 Lake Forest High School (Delaware), Felton, Kent County, Delaware, USA
 Little Flower High School Hyderabad, a school in Hyderabad, Andhra Pradesh, India
 Livermore Falls High School, Livermore Falls, Maine, USA